Sportplatz am Rothenbaum was a multi-use stadium in Hamburg, Germany, from 1910–1997. 

Situated at Rothenbaumchaussee in Rotherbaum, it was used mostly for football matches and hosted the home matches of Hamburger SV. The stadium was able to hold 27,000 people and opened in 1910. It was eventually replaced by Volksparkstadion in 1963 and was closed for good in 1997.

References

Defunct football venues in Germany
Sports venues in Hamburg
Buildings and structures in Eimsbüttel
Defunct sports venues in Germany